The 2017 BFD Energy Challenger was a professional tennis tournament played on clay courts. It was the third edition of the tournament which was part of the 2017 ATP Challenger Tour. It took place in Rome, Italy between 25 September and 1 October 2017.

Singles main-draw entrants

Seeds

 1 Rankings are as of 18 September 2017.

Other entrants
The following players received wild cards into the singles main draw:
  Andrea Arnaboldi
  Cristian Carli
  Matteo Donati
  Gian Marco Moroni

The following players received entry into the singles main draw as special exempts:
  Carlos Taberner
  Adrian Ungur

The following players received entry from the qualifying draw:
  Íñigo Cervantes
  Daniel Gimeno Traver
  Patricio Heras
  Adelchi Virgili

The following player received entry as a lucky loser:
  Elliot Benchetrit

Champions

Singles

  Filip Krajinović def.  Daniel Gimeno Traver 6–4, 6–3.

Doubles

  Martin Kližan /  Jozef Kovalík def.  Sander Gillé /  Joran Vliegen 6–3, 7–6(7–5).

References

BFD Energy Challenger
BFD Energy Challenger
BFD Energy Challenger
BFD Energy Challenger